State highway loops in Texas are owned and maintained by the Texas Department of Transportation (TxDOT).

Loop 1

Loop 1, known as Mopac Expressway or Mopac Boulevard, is a freeway around the west side of Austin.

Loop 2

Loop 2 is located in Waco. It runs from I-35 to US 84.

Loop 2 was designated on September 26, 1939, from US 81 though Waco to another point on US 81, as a renumbering of SH 2 Bypass. On November 29, 1955, the section from 18th Street and Washington Street northeast along Washington Street and Elm Street to US 81 was cancelled, and Loop 2 was instead extended west to new US 84; the old route became Spur 298 and Spur 299 in 1956. On August 5, 1966, the southern terminus was moved to US 77. On October 2, 1970, the section from I-35 to Loop 491 (now Business US 77) was redesignated as part of a rerouted US 77.

Loop 3

Loop 3 was located in New Braunfels.

Loop 3 was designated on September 26, 1939, from US 81 via New Braunfels to US 81 as a renumbering of SH 2 Bypass. On September 16, 1960, the section from SH 46 to I-35 was transferred to SH 46. The remainder of Loop 3 was cancelled on November 5, 1971, and removed from the highway system.

Loop 4

Loop 4 was located in Hays County. It began at an intersection with the southbound frontage road of I-35 north of Kyle. The route traveled due north into Buda, where it became that city's Main Street. It had intersections with FM 2770 and  RM 967 in the city. The route then traveled east before terminating at another junction with I-35.

Loop 4 was designated on September 26, 1939, as a renumbering of SH 2 Loop. The original route branched off US 81 north of Kyle and traveled northwest into Buda. The loop rejoined US 81 north of the city center. When I-35 was constructed, Loop 4 connected with the freeway at exits 217 (south of Buda) and 221 (north of Buda). Loop 4 was removed from the state highway system on May 27, 2004. The portion from I-35 exit 217 to downtown Buda was redesignated as an extension of RM 967, while the segment from the intersection of RM 967 to the former northern terminus at exit 221 was transferred to the city of Buda's jurisdiction.

Loop 5

Loop 5 was located in Kyle.

Loop 5 was designated on September 26, 1939, as a loop off US 81 through Kyle as a renumbering of SH 2 Loop. On September 23, 1950, Loop 5 was cancelled; much of the route was removed except a 0.11 mile section along Center Street that was redesignated as Spur 5 (now RM 150).

Loop 6

Loop 6 was located in Kirkland.

Loop 6 was designated on September 26, 1939, as a loop off US 370 (now US 287) through Kirkland as a renumbering of SH 5 Loop. On October 5, 1972, Loop 6 was cancelled and removed from the highway system.

Loop 7

Loop 7 encircles Athens.

Loop 7 (1939)

A previous route numbered Loop 7 was designated on September 26, 1939, as a loop off US 59 (now US 96) through Jasper as a renumbering of SH 8 Spur. On June 12, 1945, the road was reassigned to old US 96 while the former route of Loop 7 became a portion of US 96. This Loop 7 was cancelled on January 26, 1965.

Beltway 8

Beltway 8, the Sam Houston Parkway, along with the Sam Houston Tollway, is the middle highway loop around Houston.

Loop 8 (1939)

A previous route numbered Loop 8 was designated in Beaumont on September 26, 1939, running from US 59 (now US 96) to US 90, as a renumbering of SH 8 Loop#History. Loop 8 was cancelled on January 18, 1944.

Loop 9

Loop 9 is located in Dallas.

Loop 9 was designated on June 29, 2017, from I-35E to I-45. This was formerly a portion of the original Loop 9.

Loop 9 (1969)

Loop 9 formerly encircled Dallas.

Loop 9 was designated on May 6, 1969, from then-proposed I-20 back to I-20 at or near Spur 408. On October 21, 1977, Loop 9 was cancelled and removed from the highway system.

Loop 10

Loop 10 was located in Grapevine.

Loop 10 was designated on September 26, 1939, from SH 114 via Dallas Road to SH 121 as a renumbering of SH 114 Loop or SH 121 Loop. On April 25, 1960, Loop 10 was cancelled and removed from the highway system in exchange for creation of Spur 103.

Loop 11

Loop 11 (Loop 11), also known locally as Beverly Loop, is located in northwestern Wichita Falls.

Loop 11 begins at an intersection with Business U.S. Highway 277 (Bus. The road continues south of here as Beverly Drive. The highway turns sharp to the northwest at Southwest Drive before intersecting Farm to Market Road 367 (FM 367). After the intersection with FM 367, Loop 11 passes the Region 9 Education Center. Loop 11 continues to the north, junctioning with Industrial Drive and Bus. US 287, crossing over a railway line. Near Maurine Street, the highway curves to the northeast, before turning back in a more north direction. Loop 11 has a junction with US 287, a few miles southwest of Sheppard Air Force Base/Wichita Falls Municipal Airport. The highway passes near a retail center and turns east at Airport Drive before ending at I-44/US 277/US 281, with the road continuing east as FM 890.

Loop 11 was designated in 1939, running from US 287 west of Wichita Falls southward along Beverly Drive to US 277 (10th Street). The highway was extended northward in 1968 when US 287 was relocated to the Northwest Freeway. In 2002, Loop 11 was extended northward and eastward to I‑44. 

Junction list

Loop 12

Loop 12 encircles Dallas.

Loop 12 was designated on September 26, 1939, from US 175 north along Buckner Boulevard across US 80 to Buckner Orphans Home, and across US 67 to SH 114 near White Rock Lake as a renumbering of SH 40 Bypass. On June 23, 1942, the road was extended south to US 75. On August 3, 1943, the road was extended west to Ledbetter Drive and Cockrell Hill Road and north across US 80 to SH 183 near the approach to the Trinity River Bridge. Two months later the road was extended over SH 183 to US 77 at a traffic circle and east over then-SH 114 back to Loop 12, completing the loop around Dallas. On January 7, 1971, the road was rerouted over Spur 348 and a former section of SH 114; the former route of Loop 12 became Spur 482.

Loop 13

Loop 13 is located in San Antonio.

Loop 13 was created on January 18, 1937, from SH 2 to SH 16. On May 24, 1938, the road was extended to SH 3, back to SH 2 on December 1, 1938, and to a rail overpass near Kelly Field three weeks later. On September 26, 1939, the route was given the Loop 13 designation, from the rail overpass east through southern San Antonio and north to US 81 (now I-35). On May 9, 1940, the road was extended 0.186 mile west of the rail overpass, and north to US 90 on November 24, 1941. On April 14, 1947, a 2.7 mile section from US 81 west to Military Road was added, and a 4.75 mile section from Military Road west to US 281 was added on July 15, 1949. On June 25, 1952, the route was extended a final time west and south to US 90, completing the loop around San Antonio. On October 5, 1960, the section from US 90 to I-10 became a portion of I-410 and the section from I-10 to US 81 was transferred to Loop 410. On October 28, 1966, the section from I-35 to Seale Road became a section of I-410 and the section from Seale Road to I-10 was removed altogether, but this section was added back on January 24, 1978, when the road was extended north to I-410.

Loop 14

Loop 14 is located in Texarkana. The southern terminus of Loop 14 is at US 82; from here, US 82 westbound runs along New Boston Road, while eastbound US 82 continues along Texas Boulevard. Loop 14 runs north along Texas Boulevard before curving to the east. The northern terminus is at US 71 (State Line Avenue) at the Arkansas state line. The roadway continues into Texarkana, Arkansas as Arkansas Boulevard.

Loop 14 was designated on September 26, 1939, along the current route, as a renumbering of SH 47 Bypass. It is also the former routing of US 59 through Texarkana.

Loop 15

Loop 15 is located in Goldthwaite. It runs from US 183 to US 84.

Previously Loop 15 was designated on September 26, 1939, from SH 284 (now US 183) near the Bowie County Courthouse east to US 84 as a renumbering of SH 74A Business and SH 81 Business.
The Loop 15 designation was subsequently relocated and used for the short stretch of less than 1 mile from the courthouse square in the city of Goldthwaite to the intersection of US 84 in Mills County.

Loop 16

Loop 16 was located in El Paso.

Loop 16 was designated on September 26, 1939, from US 62 south along Wilmar Drive and Chelsea Drive to US 80 (now I-20) as a renumbering of SH 1 Loop. Two months later the road was rerouted on a new route to US 80 after it was found that securing the right-of-way for the original route was too expensive. On July 31, 1964, the road was extended to I-10, replacing a section of US 80A and all of Spur 1. Loop 16 was cancelled on June 26, 1974, and replaced by US 62 and US 85 after they were rerouted.

Loop 17

Loop 17 was located in Karnes City.

Loop 17 was designated on September 26, 1939, from SH 123 north of Karnes City to old US 181 (now FM 1144) in Karnes City as a renumbering of SH 123 Loop. On June 21, 1990, Loop 17 was cancelled and transferred to Business SH 123-D.

Loop 19

Loop 19 is located in Ringgold.

Loop 19 was designated on September 26, 1939, from US 82 in Ringgold via Main Street and Sixth Street to US 81 as a replacement of SH 2 Loop.

Loop 20

Loop 21

Loop 21 is located in Spur.

Loop 21 was designated on May 19, 1942, from SH 70 east of Spur along Sixth Street and Burlington Avenue to SH 70 as a redesignation and extension of Spur 21.

Loop 23

Loop 23 was located in Marlin.

Loop 23 was designated on November 30, 1978, as a loop off SH 6 in Marlin as a replacement of SH 6 after it was rerouted to bypass the town. On June 21, 1990, Loop 23 was cancelled and transferred to Business SH 6-N.

Loop 25

Loop 25 is located in Langtry.

Loop 25 was designated on October 24, 1939, from US 90 through Langtry to US 90 as a redesignation and extension of Spur 25.

Loop 34

Loop 34 is located in Chireno.

Loop 34 was designated on September 26, 1939, from SH 21 through Chireno to SH 21 as a replacement of SH 21 Loop.

Loop 36

Loop 36 is located in Keltys.

Loop 36 was designated on September 26, 1939, from US 69 through Keltys to US 69 as a replacement of SH 40 Loop.

Loop 37

Loop 37 was located in Avery.

Loop 37 was designated on September 26, 1939, as a loop off US 82 in Avery as a renumbering of SH 5 Loop. On June 21, 1990, Loop 37 was cancelled and transferred to Business US 82-K.

Loop 38

Loop 38 was located in Bogata.

Loop 38 was designated on September 26, 1939, as a loop off US 271 in Bogata as a renumbering of SH 49 Bypass. On August 25, 1952, a 0.5 mile spur connection to SH 37 was added as Spur 38. Loop 38 was cancelled on June 21, 1990, and transferred to Business US 271-D.

Loop 39

Loop 39 was located in Merkel.

Loop 39 was designated on October 30, 1958, as a loop off U.S. Route 80 (now I-20 in Merkel as a replacement for US 80 after it was rerouted. On June 21, 1990, Loop 39 was cancelled and transferred to Business I-20-P.

Loop 40

Loop 40 is located northwest of Midland.

Loop 40 was designated on May 29, 1991, from FM 1788 northwest of Midland east, north, and southwest to FM 1788 as a redesignation and extension of Spur 217.

Loop 42

Loop 42 is located in Roaring Springs.

Loop 42 was designated on September 26, 1939, on from Second St and SH 70 north of to Poplar St and SH 70 southeast of Roaring Springs as a renumbering of SH 18 Spur.

Loop 43

Loop 43 is located in Tatum.

Loop 43 was designated on September 26, 1939, from SH 43 though Tatum to SH 43 as a renumbering of SH 43 Loop.

Loop 44

Loop 44 was located in Levelland.

Loop 44 was designated on September 25, 1939, as a loop off SH 24 in Levelland as a renumbering of SH 24 Loop. On March 9, 1951, the route was modified to run from SH 290 (now SH 114) to SH 51 (now US 385). Loop 44 was cancelled by district request on January 26, 1993, and transferred to Business SH 114-B.

Loop 46

Loop 46 is located in Post.

Loop 46 was designated on September 26, 1939, from US 380 though Post to US 84 as a renumbering of SH 7 Loop.

Loop 47

Loop 47 is located in Jolly.

Loop 47 was designated on May 21, 1979, from US 82 west of Jolly to US 82 east of Jolly.

Loop 47 (1931)

Loop 47 was located in Bovina.

Loop 47 was designated as a loop off US 60 in Bovina as a renumbering of SH 33 Loop. On July 1, 1941, Loop 47 was cancelled and transferred to Spur 122 (now FM 1731).

Loop 48

Loop 48 was located in Canyon.

Loop 48 was designated on August 29, 1958, from US 87 near Canyon east and south to SH 217, 1 mile east of US 87. On June 27, 2019, Loop 48 was cancelled and returned to the city of Canyon because West Texas A&M University has expanded across the road, which is partially inside the university property, and West Texas A&M will make improvements to the road.

Loop 49

Loop 50

Loop 50 was located in Burleson.

Loop 50 was designated on September 25, 1939, as a loop off SH 174 in Burleson with a spur to US 81. On May 31, 1957, the road was cancelled, with the Ellison Street section becoming part of Spur 50 (which was later rerouted off this alignment entirely, and was later cancelled); the remainder is now Commerce Street.

Loop 51

Loop 51 was located in Gonzales.

Loop 51 was designated on September 25, 1939, as a loop off US 77 in Yoakum as a renumbering of SH 72 Bypass. On June 21, 1990, Loop 51 was cancelled and transferred to Business Alternate US 77.

Loop 57

Loop 57 was located in Conroe.

Loop 57 was designated on December 30, 1960, as a redesignation of Spur 57 when the southern terminus was moved to US 75 (now SH 75), forming a loop off US 75. On May 1, 1980, a 0.3 mile section was transferred to SH 105 and the route was changed back to Spur 57.

Loop 60

Loop 60 is a business loop of US 175 that serves the unincorporated community of LaRue. It begins at an intersection with US 175 west of LaRue. The highway travels in an eastern direction and intersects FM 607 near the center of town, then turns south at CR 4350. Loop 60 continues to travel southward before ending at another intersection with US 175 southeast of LaRue.

Loop 60 was designated on September 29, 1939, along its current route.

Loop 61

Loop 61 was located in Eustace.

Loop 61 was designated on September 25, 1939, as a loop off US 175 in Eustace. On June 21, 1990, by district request, a 0.16 mile section from US 175 to FM 316 was removed from the highway system (this section is now Wheeler Street) and the remaining 0.1 mile section from FM 316 to US 175 became an extension of FM 316.

Loop 62

Loop 62 is located in Rusk.

Loop 62 was designated on September 25, 1939, from US 69 through Rusk to US 69.

Loop 64

Loop 64 was located in Dripping Springs. It was a former alignment of US 290.

Loop 66

Loop 66 was located in Kilgore.

Loop 66 was designated on August 1, 1956, as a redesignation of Spur 66 when it was extended through Kilgore to SH 26. The route was signed as Business SH 26 rather than Loop 66. On June 14, 1968, Loop 66 was cancelled and removed from the highway system.

Loop 67

Loop 67 was located in Ackerly.

Loop 67 was designated on October 24, 1941, as a redesignation of Spur 67 when it was extended to US 87 east of Ackerly. On January 29, 1953, a 0.6 mile section was transferred to FM 2002. The remainder of Loop 67 was cancelled on April 1, 1954, and transferred to FM 2212.

Loop 68

Loop 68 was located in Buna.

Loop 68 was designated on September 25, 1939, as a loop off US 59 in Buna as a renumbering of SH 8 Loop. On January 18, 1955, the route was changed to Spur 68 and modified to run from US 96 to SH 62.

Loop 70

Loop 70 is located in Rockport.

Loop 70 was designated on September 25, 1939, as a loop off SH 35 in Rockport. Although Loop 70 was cancelled and transferred to Business SH 35-L on June 21, 1990, it was restored on April 27, 1995, as a replacement of Business SH 35-L after it was reassigned to a former routing of SH 35 when SH 35 was rerouted along FM 3036. On March 30, 2006, a section was removed and returned to Rockport and Loop 70 was rerouted on top of a section of FM 1069 to Business SH 35.

Loop 71

Loop 71 was designated on May 5, 1966, from US 183, to the grave site of James Fannin, and northward and westward through the La Bahia Mission area to US 183.

Loop 73

Loop 73 was located in Sinton.

Loop 73 was designated on September 17, 1980, as a replacement for US 77 when it was rerouted north and west of Sinton. On June 21, 1990, Loop 73 was cancelled and transferred to Business US 77-T.

Loop 75

Loop 75 is located in Lockney.

Loop 75 was designated on September 25, 1939, from US 70 through Lockney to US 70 as a renumbering of SH 28 Loop and SH 28 Spur. On June 22, 1944, a 0.4 mile spur connection to the Lockney business district was added (this became a portion FM 135 in 1951), but was signed as Loop 75. On January 20, 1964, the section along East 8th Street became a portion of FM 378.

Loop 76

Loop 76 is the old route of US 87 through O'Donnell, formed on September 26, 1939, as a renumbering of SH 9 Loop.

Loop 77

Loop 77 was located in Tulia.

Loop 77 was designated on September 25, 1939, from 0.17 mile north of the SH 86/Loop 9 intersection to the First Street/US 87 intersection. On August 6, 1951, the section along Maxwell Street was transferred to FM 146. The remainder of Loop 77 was cancelled on September 24, 1963, and transferred to FM 1318.

Loop 79

Loop 79 is located in Del Rio.

Loop 79 was designated on June 26, 2008, from US 277 via Del Rio to US 90. It serves as a bypass of Del Rio.

Loop 79 (1939)

The original Loop 79 was designated on September 25, 1939, from SH 117 (now SH 136/SH 207) via Stinnett to SH 152 when SH 152 was rerouted off of this road. On June 22, 1990, Loop 79 was cancelled and transferred to Business SH 152-B.

Loop 81

Loop 81 was located in Aransas Pass.

Loop 81 was designated on October 24, 1939, as a loop off SH 35 in Aransas Pass as a replacement of SH 35 when it was rerouted. On June 21, 1990, Loop 81 was cancelled and transferred to Business SH 35-M (now Loop 90).

Loop 82

Loop 82 is located in San Marcos.

The southern terminus of Loop 82 is at I-35 exit 204A; the route travels along Guadalupe Street to the north of the exit, while SH 123 begins in the other direction. At Grove Street, the route splits along a pair of one-way streets, with northbound traffic using LBJ Drive and southbound traffic using Guadalupe Street. Loop 82 crosses RM 12 before the route turns to the east, with both directions using University Drive. The route passes San Marcos City Park and crosses the San Marcos River, then passes through the eastern part of the Texas State University campus as Aquarena Springs Drive. Loop 82 reaches its northern terminus at I-35 exit 206.

Loop 82 was designated on December 18, 1939, connecting with US 81 at both ends. It followed Waller, Colorado, Austin, and Hopkins Streets, the last of which is now signed as RM 12. After the decommissioning of US 81 south of Fort Worth, the designation was amended in 1992 to indicate the current endpoints at I-35.

Loop 83

Loop 83 is located in Caldwell.

Loop 83 was designated on December 18, 1939, from SH 21 through Caldwell via Main Street and Buck Street to a point on SH 36.

Loop 84

Loop 84 is located in Gruver. The  route connects SH 15 and SH 136.

Loop 84 was designated on September 26, 1945, as a redesignation of Spur 84 when it was reassigned as a loop off FM 289 (now SH 15). On September 14, 1951, a  section was transferred to FM 278 (now SH 136).

Loop 87

Loop 87 was located in Zapata.

Loop 87 was designated on December 8, 1939, as a loop off US 83 in Zapata. On December 1, 1953, Loop 87 was eliminated from the highway system after US 83 was rerouted.

Loop 88

Loop 88 (1939)

The original Loop 88 was designated on December 8, 1939, as a loop off US 83 in San Ygnacio. On June 21, 1990, Loop 88 was cancelled and transferred to Business US 83-N.

Loop 90

Loop 90 is located in Aransas Pass.

Loop 90 was designated on April 27, 1995, as a loop off Business SH 35-L (former SH 35), replacing Business SH 35-M.

Loop 90 (1981)

The original Loop 90 was designated on June 23, 1981, as a loop off US 59 in Livingston as a replacement for US 59 when it was rerouted. On June 21, 1990, Loop 90 was cancelled on June 21, 1990, and transferred to Business US 59-J.

Loop 93

Loop 93 was located in Sherman and Denison.

Loop 93 was designated on June 8, 1984, from US 75 northeast 6 miles to SH 75A (now SH 91) and Spur 503 in Denison as a replacement of US 75 when it was rerouted. On October 25, 1990, and transferred to Business US 75-C (now SH 91 and Spur 503).

Loop 96

Loop 96 is located in Talco.

Loop 96 was designated on April 30, 1959, from FM 71 via Sixth Street and Broad Street to US 271.

Loop 96 (1946)

Loop 96 was designated on October 15, 1946 (although officially designated as Spur 96) as a loop off Spur 96 through Prairie View A & M College. On July 9, 1951, the loop portion was officially designated as Loop 96. Loop 96 was cancelled on January 16, 1953, and redesignated as a loop connection of FM 1098, but FM 1098 was rerouted over the loop connection on September 29, 1976.

Loop 98

Loop 98 is located in Kerrville.

Loop 98 was designated on April 29, 2010, from FM 1338 south and southeast to SH 16 as a redesignation of Spur 98.

References

+0
State highway loops 0
State highway loops 0